The 1903 Rhode Island gubernatorial election was held on November 3, 1903. Incumbent Democrat Lucius F. C. Garvin defeated Republican nominee Samuel Pomeroy Colt with 49.29% of the vote.

General election

Candidates
Major party candidates
Lucius F. C. Garvin, Democratic 
Samuel Pomeroy Colt, Republican

Other candidates
William O. Angilly, Socialist Labor
Frederick T. Jencks, Prohibition
James E. Furlong, Socialist

Results

References

1903
Rhode Island
1903 Rhode Island elections